Brian Peter Crawford (8 June 1926 – 30 July 2004) was an Australian politician. Born in Hobart, he was elected to the Tasmanian House of Assembly in 1956 as a Labor member for Franklin. He was defeated in 1959.

References

1926 births
2004 deaths
Members of the Tasmanian House of Assembly
Australian Labor Party members of the Parliament of Tasmania